Lung Sing, formerly called Diamond Hill, is one of the 25 constituencies in the Wong Tai Sin District in Hong Kong.

The constituency returns one district councillor to the Wong Tai Sin District Council, with an election every four years. The seat has been currently held by former legislator Mandy Tam, previously affiliated with The Frontier and the People Power.

Lung Sing constituency is loosely based on Diamond Hill area including Lung Poon Court, Galaxia, Bel Air Heights, Fung Chuen Court and Regent On The Hill. The estimated population in 2019 is 19,166.

Councillors represented

Diamond Hill (1994–2003)

Lung Sing (2003 to present)

Election results

2010s

2000s

1990s

References

Diamond Hill
Constituencies of Hong Kong
Constituencies of Wong Tai Sin District Council
2003 establishments in Hong Kong
Constituencies established in 2003